Pannonia Film Studio (also known as MAFILM Pannónia Filmstúdió) was the largest animation studio in Hungary, based in the capital of Budapest. It was formed in 1951, becoming independent in 1957. The studio is said to have closed sometime around 2015.

Notable people
PannóniaFilm's roster of notable animators includes Attila Dargay, Marcell Jankovics, József Gémes, Ottó Foky, Ferenc Rofusz, Gábor Csupó, Sándor Reisenbüchler, István Orosz, Líviusz Gyulai, Dóra Keresztes, and Zsolt Richly.

Films

Animated short films
A kiskakas gyémánt félkrajcárja ("The Cockerel's Diamond Coin") - Gyula Macskássy, 1951
Ceruza és radír ("Pencil and India Rubber") - Gyula Macskássy-György Várnai, 1960
A három nyúl ("The Three Rabbits") - Attila Dargay, 1972
Sisyphus - Marcell Jankovics, 1974
A légy ("The Fly") - Ferenc Rófusz, 1980

Animated series
Gusztáv ("Gustav" or "Gustavus") - Dargay-Nepp-Jankovics, 1964
Mézga család ("The Mézga Family") - József Nepp, József Romhányi (writer), 1969
Frakk, a macskák réme ("Tails, The Terror of Cats") - Gyula Macskássy, András Cseh, István Imre, 1971
A Kockásfülű nyúl - Zsolt Richly (director), Veronika Marék (writer), 1974
Kérem a következőt ("Next, please!") - József Nepp (director, writer), Béla Ternovszky (director), József Romhányi (writer), 1974
Magyar népmesék ("Hungarian Folk Tales") - Marcell Jankovics, 1977
Vízipók-csodapók ("Water-Spider, Wonder-Spider") - Szabolcs Szabó, Szombati Szabó Csaba, József Haui, 1978
Pom Pom meséi ("Tales of Pom Pom") - Attila Dargay (director), István Csukás (writer), 1980
Meister Eder und sein Pumuckl - Ulrich König (director), 1982
Leó és Fred ("Leo and Fred") - Pál Tóth, 1984
Mecki und seine Freunde - Béla Ternovszky, 1995

Full-length animated films
János vitéz ("Johnny Corncob") - Marcell Jankovics, 1973
Hugo, a víziló ("Hugo the Hippo") - Bill Feigenbaum, 1975
Lúdas Matyi ("Mattie the Gooseboy") - Attila Dargay, 1977
Habfürdö ("Foam Bath") - György Kovásznai, 1979
Fehérlófia ("The Son of the White Mare") - Marcell Jankovics, 1981
Vuk ("The Little Fox") - Attila Dargay, 1981
Time Masters ("Az Idő urai") - René Laloux, Tibor Hernádi (technical director), 1982 (French-Hungarian co-production)
Suli-buli ("Schooltime Blues") - Ferenc Varsányi, 1982
Vízipók-csodapók ("Water-Spider, Wonder-Spider") - Szabolcs Szabó, József Haui, Szombati Szabó Csaba, 1982
Háry János ("John the Boaster") - Zsolt Richly, 1983
Misi mókus kalandjai ("The Adventures of Sam the Squirrel") - Ottó Foky, 1983
Hófehér ("No-White") - József Nepp, 1983
Daliás idők ("Heroic Times") - József Gémes, 1984
Szaffi ("The Treasure of Swamp Castle") - Attila Dargay, 1984
Mátyás, az igazságos ("Matthias the Just") - László Ujváry, 1985
Egy kutya feljegyzései ("Gréti...!") - József Nepp, 1986
Macskafogó ("Cat City") - Béla Ternovszky, 1986
Es lebe Servatius ("Long Live Servatius") - Ottó Foky, 1986
Nefelejcs ("Forget-Me-Not") - Elek Lisziák, 1988
Az erdõ kapitánya ("The Captain of the Forest") - Attila Dargay, 1988
Felix the Cat: The Movie - Tibor Hernádi, 1988
Vili, a veréb ("Willy the Sparrow") - József Gémes, 1989
Sárkány és papucs ("Dragon and Slippers") - Tibor Hernádi, 1990
A hetedik testvér ("The Seventh Brother") - Jenő Koltai, Tibor Hernádi, 1991
A hercegnő és a kobold ("The Princess and the Goblin") - József Gémes, 1991
Vacak 2 - az erdő hőse ("Tiny Heroes") - Jenő Koltai, József Gémes, 1997
Ének a csodaszarvasról ("Song of the Miraculous Hind") - Marcell Jankovics, 2001
The Princess and the Pea - Mark Swan, 2002 (American-Hungarian co-production)
Macskafogó 2 - A sátán macskája ("Cat City 2: The Cat of Satan") - Béla Ternovszky, 2007
Imre Madách's The Tragedy of Man - Marcell Jankovics, 2011

Awards
In 1981, Pannónia's three-minute production, The Fly (A légy) by Ferenc Rófusz, won the Academy Award for Best Animated Short Film.

Other awards
Forest Sports Contest by Gyula Macskássy: 1954 Paris - I. Prize
Two Little Oxen  by Gyula Macskássy: 1957 Warsaw - I. Prize
Ball with White Dots by Tibor Csermák: 1961 Venice - Golden Lion
Duel by Gyula Macskássy: 1961 Cannes - Special Prize of the Jury
Double Portrait by György Kovásznai: 1965 Mannheim - Golden Ducat
Five Minute Thrill by József Nepp: 1967 Oberhausen - Main Prize
Language Lesson by Béla Vajda: 1968 Oberhausen - Grand Prize
Homo Faber by Tamás Szabó Sípos: 1968 Phnom-Penh - Golden Lion
Concertissimo by József Gémes: 1968 Chicago - Silver Hugo
Variations on a Dragon by Attila Dargay: 1968 Mamaia - Silver Pelican
Urbanization by Gyula Macskássy: 1969 New York - Blue Ribbon Prize
Deep Water by Marcell Jankovics: 1971 Annecy - Special Prize
Success by Gyula Macskássy: 1972 Cracow - Special Prize
2 by Sándor Reisenbüchler: 1973 Cannes - Special Prize
Modern Sports Coaching by Béla Ternovszky: 1974 Munich - Grand Prize
Kidnapping of the Sun and the Moon by Sándor Reisenbüchler: 1974 New York - Special Prize of the Jury
Let's Keep a Dog by Béla Ternovszky: 1975 New York - Category I.Prize
Sisyphus by Marcell Jankovics: 1975 Teheran - Prize of the Critics
Silence by István Orosz: 1977 Zagreb - The best first film
Scenes With Beans by Ottó Foky: 1977 Lausanne - Grand Prix
Fight by Marcell Jankovics: 1977 Cannes - Golden Palm
New Tenants by Líviusz Gyulai: 1978 Cairo - Golden Nofretete
I Think Life is a Great Fun... by Kati Macskássy: 1978 Melbourne - I.Prize
Mattie the Gooseboy Attila Dargay: 1979 Salerno - Silver Cup
The Fly by Ferenc Rófusz: 1980: Ottawa – Category Prize; 1981: Lille – Main Prize; 1981 Hollywood – Oscar; 1982: Espinho – Category Prize
Moto Perpetuo by Béla Vajda: 1981 Cannes - Golden Palm
Animalia by Tibor Hernádi: 1981 Melbourne - Special Prize of the Jury
The Luncheon by Csaba Varga: 1982 Lille - Grand Prix
Vizipók-csodapók ("Water Spider Wonder Spider"): 1985 Kecskemét - Children's Prize,; 1988 Kecskemét - Jury's Diploma of Merit for backgrounds
Gravitation by Ferenc Rófusz: 1984 Toronto - Category I. Prize
Daliás idők ("Heroic Times") by József Gémes: 1985 Annecy - The best animated feature; Kecskemét - Best Animated Feature
Snow-White József Nepp: 1984 Giffoni - Grand Prize
Deadlock by Ferenc Rófusz: 1984 Stuttgart - Special Prize of the Jury
Motorture by Ferenc Cakó: 1985 Antibes - Golden Siren
Fények virradat elött ("Lights Before Dawn") by Sándor Békési: 1985 Espinho - Category Prize; 1988 Kecskemét - Best First Film
Ah, Amerika! ("Ah, America!") by István Orosz: 1985 Kecskemét - Best Script; 1986 Oberhausen - Prize of International Film Clubs
A szél ("The Wind") by Csaba Varga: 1987 Hiroshima - Category I. Prize; 1988 Kecskemét - Best Short Film, Best Music, and Best Graphic Design
Magic by Dóra Keresztes: 1987 Espinho – Category Prize
Ab Ovo by Ferenc Cakó: 1988 Cannes - The best animated film
Dirt by Marcell Jankovics: 1989 Lille - Special Prize of the Jury
Vili, a veréb ("Willy the Sparrow") by József Gémes: 1989 Chicago - Category II.Prize; 1993 Kecskemét - Prize of the Audience
Isten Veled, Kis Sziget! ("Farewell, Little Island") by Sándor Reisenbüchler: 1988 Kecskemét - Kecskemét City Award; 1989 Lille - The best short film
Vigyázat lépcső! ("Mind the Steps!") by István Orosz: 1991 Győr – Mediawave, Main Prize; Los Angeles - International Tournée of Animation; 1993 Kecskemét - Best Short Film
Ad Rem by Ferenc Cakó: 1991 San Francisco - Category I.Prize
The Princess and the Goblin by József Gémes: 1994 Fort Lauderdale - The best film for children
Ecotopia by Sándor Reisenbüchler: 1997 Cairo - Silver Cairo
A kalókoz szeretője ("The Lover of Pirates") by Zsofia Péterffy: 2002 Venezia - Prix UIP; Kecskemét - Grand Prix
Ének a csodaszarvasról ("Song of the Miraculous Hind") by Marcell Jankovics: 2002 Kecskemét - Award of the National Radio and Television Commission

References

External links
MAFILM - MAFILM
PannóniaFilm
 

Companies based in Budapest
Hungarian animation studios
Hungarian brands
Entertainment companies established in 1951
1951 establishments in Hungary
Film production companies of Hungary